The Collection is a 5-CD box set, released to coincide Houston's Nothing but Love World Tour, that comprises five of Houston's multi-platinum albums, from Whitney Houston (1985) to My Love Is Your Love (1998) excluding The Preacher's Wife soundtrack (1996). Each disc is presented in mini-LP style card picture sleeves, housed in a picture box with a lift-off lid.

Track listing

Disc 1: Whitney Houston

Disc 2: Whitney

Disc 3: I'm Your Baby Tonight

Disc 4: The Bodyguard: Original Soundtrack Album

Disc 5: My Love Is Your Love

Charts

Weekly charts

Monthly charts

References

External links 
 The Collection at Discogs
 The Collection at Allmusic

Whitney Houston compilation albums
2010 greatest hits albums
Arista Records compilation albums